Tân Phước may refer to several places in Vietnam, including:

Tân Phước District, a rural district of Tiền Giang Province
Tân Phước, Bà Rịa-Vũng Tàu, a ward of Phú Mỹ
Tân Phước, Bình Thuận, a ward of La Gi
Tân Phước, Bình Phước, a commune of Đồng Phú District
Tân Phước, Gò Công Đông, a commune of Gò Công Đông District
Tân Phước, Lai Vung, a commune of Lai Vung District in Đồng Tháp Province
Tân Phước, Tân Hồng, a commune of Tân Hồng District in Đồng Tháp Province

See also
Tân Phước Tây, a commune of Tân Trụ District in Long An Province